Utopia is the name of a transitional serif typeface designed by Robert Slimbach and released by Adobe Systems in 1989.

Design
Utopia qualifies as a transitional serif typeface: one based on 18th- and early-19th-century ideals of classical design. Adobe's release notes cite Baskerville and Walbaum as influences, and Adobe's Sumner Stone has also compared it to Hermann Zapf's Melior. It was one of the first typefaces to be part of Adobe's Originals programme, designed to feature a large range of styles for professional use. With a reasonably solid design, Utopia was sometimes used by newspapers.

Current versions of the typeface are released in the OpenType format and include features such as ligatures and small capitals. It is released in four optical variants, for display, headline, regular and caption text sizes, each in regular, semibold and bold weights. A black (extra-bold) weight is available in the headline size. Slimbach made some changes to the font when revisiting it for the OpenType release, and Adobe does not guarantee identical character metrics. This means documents developed using one font file should not be switched to using another, at risk of lines breaking in different places.

Free software release
Uniquely for Adobe's professional typefaces, a basic set of Utopia's styles has been open-sourced by Adobe, allowing it to be used for free. This comprises regular, italic, bold and bold italic styles of the regular size, with 229 glyphs for each, including ligatures but not small capitals. Adobe donated the Utopia typeface (in the form of PostScript Type 1 files) to the X Consortium, for use in the X Window System, a popular graphical environment for Unix workstations. Conversions of the Type 1 files to ttf and otf files have also been made. This release is designed for use at small text sizes, with a large x-height and quite thick stroke widths. Adobe retains rights to the Utopia name, and prohibits modified fonts from being redistributed without the name being changed.

The OpenType version that Adobe now distributes commercially was modified from the open-sourced PostScript fonts, and Adobe does not guarantee that the font metrics are the same.

Initial donation to the X Consortium
There was controversy around the license regarding the status of the font files as free software. Many distributors (with one of the prominent being the Debian project), to prevent being sued, opted to state clearly that the fonts had a non-clear license which prevented it from being freely redistributable with modifications. After considerable debate, Adobe formally donated the Type 1 version of the font, on October 11, 2006, to the TeX Users Group (TUG), with clarified concerns regarding its use licensing, so that it could be used with, for instance, Donald Knuth's program TeX, a digital typesetting system for computers. The version donated consisted of the Roman (Regular), Italic, Bold, and Bold Italic versions of the typeface, differently from the commercial version offered as part of the Adobe Originals Pack. On November 17, 2006, Karl Berry, the TeX Users Group President, gave irrevocable permissions of the font to any third party and it constitutes free software.

Derived typefaces
The original Utopia typeface has, since being released as free software, been modified to support glyphs in scripts other than the basic Latin script: at least three projects have emerged from the sources that Adobe has donated, one being an adaptation to Vietnamese, called Vntopia, by Hàn Thế Thành.

Another further development of the original was made by Andrey V. Panov, in an OpenType derivative called Heuristica (also: "Эвристика"), with the primary intent of adding Cyrillic symbols. Andrey has also incorporated Hàn Thế Thành's Vietnamese glyphs in Heuristica and the development of the project is open.

From the Heuristica font family, Andreas Nolda created Utopia Nova font family in 2015, changing this reserved name to Lingua Franca OpenType and Web Open Font Format fonts in 2016. Andreas Nolda added proportional figures and a stylistic set with longer slashes, matching the parentheses in height and depth to Lingua Franca OpenType and Web Open Font Format fonts.

In 2016 Stefan Peev created Linguistics Pro font family as a fork of Nolda's Utopia Nova. Linguistics Pro contains two models of Cyrillic glyphs. The base range of the Cyrillic glyphs (uni0410:uni044F) represents the modern Bulgarian letterform model. The traditional Cyrillic letterform model is included as a local feature for Russian language and as a Stylistic Set 01. Stylistic Set 02 is for Serbian and Macedonian texts (in Regular and Bold variants) and for Serbian texts in Italic and Bold Italic variants. Stylistic Set 03 is for Macedonian texts (in Italic and Bold variants). Linguistics Pro also contains polytonic Greek.

Lawsuit

From 1995 to 1997, Adobe filed several complaints against Southern Software, Inc. regarding the latter company's use of the Utopia font, under the name "Veracity", in its products.  In 1998, the United States District Court for the Northern District of California ruled in favor of Adobe, finding that Southern Software, Inc.'s font software infringed Adobe's copyright.  Although typefaces are held to be unprotectable by copyright under United States copyright law, the court found that the control points used by the font software to generate the typeface were protectable.

References

External links
 Adobe's current professional release of Utopia in optical sizes
 Adobe's standard release of Utopia, without optical sizes
 Adobe's licensing page for Utopia for website use
 Utopia available for free download (note: these are .pfa files and may require conversion to be installable on your system)
 Ghostscript release in otf and ttf formats
 Utopia open-source license

Transitional serif typefaces
Adobe typefaces
Typefaces with optical sizes
Open-source typefaces
Typefaces and fonts introduced in 1989
Typefaces designed by Robert Slimbach